Babuyi Rural District is a rural district (dehestan) in Basht District, Basht County, Kohgiluyeh and Boyer-Ahmad Province, Iran. At the 2006 census, its population was 9,606, in 1,824 families. The rural district has 58 villages.

References 

Rural Districts of Kohgiluyeh and Boyer-Ahmad Province
Basht County